Noiseau is a commune in the southeastern suburbs of Paris, France.

Transport
Noiseau is served by no station of the Paris Métro, RER, or suburban rail network. The closest station to Noiseau is Sucy–Bonneuil station on Paris RER line A. This station is located in the neighboring commune of Sucy-en-Brie,  from the town center of Noiseau.

Population

Education
The commune has two primary schools, École maternelle Albert Camus (preschool/nursery school) and École élémentaire Jean-Jaurès.

Secondary schools in nearby communes:
 Junior high schools: Collège du Parc and Collège du Fort in Sucy-en-Brie
 Senior high schools/sixth-form colleges: Lycée Guillaume Budé in Limeil-Brévannes, Lycée Christophe Colomb and Lycée Montaleau in Sucy-en-Brie

See also
Communes of the Val-de-Marne department

References

External links

 Home page 

Communes of Val-de-Marne